Ionov (masculine) and Ionova (feminine) is a Russian surname. It is shared by the following people:

Aleksandr Vladimirovich Ionov (born 1983), Russian football player
Aleksei Sergeyevich Ionov (born 1989), Russian footballer
Alexander Viktorovich Ionov (born 1989), Russian businessman and political figure
Anatoli Semyonovich Ionov (born 1939), Soviet ice hockey player
Anatoly Ionov (born 1936), Romanov claimant
Mariya Mykolayevna Ionova (born 1978 in Kyiv), Ukrainian politician
Maksim Ionov (born 1976), Russian footballer.
Natalya Ilinichna Ionova (born 1986), Russian singer with stage name Glukoza

See also

Russian-language surnames